German submarine U-303 was a Type VIIC U-boat of Nazi Germany's Kriegsmarine during World War II. She saw service in the Atlantic Ocean and Mediterranean Sea, and sank one freighter of 4,959 GRT in her two short and uneventful war patrols. Built in 1941 and 1942 at Lübeck, U-303 was a Type VIIC U-boat, capable of lengthy ocean patrols and of operating in distant environments.

Design
German Type VIIC submarines were preceded by the shorter Type VIIB submarines. U-303 had a displacement of  when at the surface and  while submerged. She had two shafts and two  propellers.

U-303 was fitted with five  torpedo tubes (four fitted at the bow and one at the stern), fourteen torpedoes, one  SK C/35 naval gun, 220 rounds, and two twin  C/30 anti-aircraft guns. The boat had a complement of between forty-four and sixty.

Service history

First patrol
U-303 departed Kiel under the command of Kapitänleutnant Karl-Franz Heine on New Year's Day 1942, arriving at Lorient in France after a two and a half month passage. The spring of 1943 was the turning point for the Battle of the Atlantic, targets were getting harder to come by for German units. U-303 was no exception, managing to sink only one ship, the 4,959 GRT American vessel SS Expositor, on 23 February (which had been already crippled by U-606 and abandoned)

Second patrol and loss
Her second patrol was uneventful and very brief, simply a fourteen-day journey between Lorient and La Spezia in Italy, although it did involve passing through the heavily defended Strait of Gibraltar. She was to join a new flotilla operating in the Mediterranean Sea.

From La Spezia U-303 moved to Toulon in occupied France, from where she was to operate against British shipping aiding in operations following the evacuation of Tunisia. On her first attempt to do this, on 21 May 1943, she exited Toulon harbour on the surface and ran straight into the British submarine , which torpedoed the U-boat before escaping. U-303 began to settle and list, and Heine ordered an immediate evacuation into life rafts which eventually carried the surviving crew to the French coast ten miles away. Ten sailors were less lucky, having been killed in the torpedo impact, and went down with their U-boat in position .

Summary of raiding history

References

Bibliography

External links

German Type VIIC submarines
World War II shipwrecks in the Mediterranean Sea
U-boats sunk by British submarines
U-boats commissioned in 1942
1942 ships
U-boats sunk in 1943
World War II submarines of Germany
Ships built in Lübeck
Maritime incidents in May 1943